Universe 3 is a 1989 video game published by Omnitrend Software for MS-DOS, Atari ST, and Amiga. It was written by William Leslie and Thomas Carbone. Universe 3 follows Omintrend's Universe from 1983 and Universe II from 1986.

Gameplay
Universe 3 is a game in which the player is a starship captain on a diplomatic mission.

Reception
Douglas Seacat reviewed the game for Computer Gaming World, and stated that "Frankly, Universe III is not as good as its most recent predecessors (Breach and Paladin). Where its predecessors demonstrated flexibility and depth, Universe III is rigid and narrow. Those who have played Universe and Universe II will want to play this game to continue the series and some Amiga and IBM owners will want to play the game as a diversion. Nevertheless, one cannot help but have the feeling that Universe III is not what Omnitrend was shooting for."

Reviews
The Games Machine - Jan, 1990
ST Format - Oct, 1990
Zzap! - Nov, 1990

References

External links
Review in Info

1989 video games
Adventure games
Amiga games
Atari ST games
DOS games
Science fiction video games
Top-down video games
Video game sequels
Video games developed in the United States
Video games set in outer space